Watson & Oliver is a British sketch show starring Lorna Watson and Ingrid Oliver, known for their performances together at the Edinburgh Fringe. The show features a mixture of pre-recorded sketches and material performed in front of a studio audience. It was shown on BBC Two and BBC HD; the first series began on 20 February 2012. A second and final series started on 25 April 2013.

Production
The programme was filmed in front of a live studio audience. It is a co-production between the BBC's in-house comedy department and independent production company Popper Pictures.

Episodes

Series 1 (2012)
Regular characters included a pair of Georgian ladies, a guard and inmate at a women's prison, Playboy bunnies Candy and April, and Prince William and Kate Middleton reminiscing about their wedding day. Guest stars for this series included John Barrowman, Daniel Rigby, Adrian Scarborough, Sophie Thompson, Felicity Montagu, Daisy Aitkens, Hugo Speer, Colin Salmon and Perry Benson.

Series 2 (2013)
A guard and inmate at a women's prison, two policewomen and the scholars Fi and Bea are regular characters of this series.

Reception
The first series of Watson & Oliver received mixed reviews. The Daily Telegraph found the show "hugely enjoyable" and said "it has a rare sense of comic mischief that teases but doesn't offend". However, the Radio Times gave a negative review, saying that "on the whole it's pretty poor, with a few thin laughs in a clutch of woefully under-written sketches".

The Daily Mirror gave a mixed review, saying "They’ve got the talent and are both immensely likeable, but what they’re lacking right now is better material." as did The Independent, which found the show's style "old-fashioned" but said "They are both talented comic actresses as well as comedians. A more up-to-date vehicle would help."

The first series' opening episode drew 1.05 million viewers, but the audience shrank to 550,000 viewers by the end of the series.

References

External links

2010s British television sketch shows
2012 British television series debuts
2013 British television series endings
BBC high definition shows
BBC television sketch shows
English-language television shows